La Tele is a minor television network operated by Grupo ATV, in turn owned by Albavisión, airing exclusively imported programming, similar in profile to other secondary channels of the network, like Repretel 4, Nicaragua's Canal 9 and Guatemala's TeleOnce and Trecevisión.

History 
Alliance SAC won eight licenses in six provinces to spread the signal of Uranio 15, however, these licenses are currently used to rebroadcast the programming of Andina de Radiodifusión (ATV), channel 9 in Lima. With these licenses, Vera Abad managed to ATV's transmission network, using permits issued on behalf of Uranio 15.

Uranio 15 (established in 1994) was a channel that had some programs led by Oscar Gayoso, Pedro Sanchez, Chris, Roxana among other presenters. Its main program was "The Ranking" and of course a large selection of music videos of all genres, 24 hours a day. Uranio 15 was one of the biggest UHF channels of its time, then in 2007 it started broadcasting music videos without identification.

When Mexican businessman Remigio Ángel González took over the control of Grupo ATV through Albavisión Communications Group LLC, Uranio 15 disappeared, replaced by La Tele. At launch, the channel focused on a female demographic, with telenovelas being transmitted on weekdays and movies (some already transmitted by ATV and some premieres) on weekends.

In January 2013, the channel relaunched with premieres of international series in the evening hours and some short programs aimed at women.

In April 2015, Global TV was replaced by Red TV and the entire childish and youth output moved to the channel. In November that year, the channel's logo color switched to yellow.

In April 2017, the channel added more telenovelas to its programming and continued the cartoon block in the morning, as well as the inclusion of more American movies, series, comedies and reality shows, and its programming is now focused on a family demographic. Disney's youth series and comedies were shared with its sister channel NexTV.

Since January 2018, the channel has increased the hours of the childish and youth block to 10 hours. The rest of the programming consists of telenovelas on weekdays and reality shows, American action series and some movies on weekends. In February that year, La Tele changed its aspect ratio from 4:3 to 16:9. Since June, it began broadcasting infomercials from the natural food companies Fitosana and Nutrsa Life in its programming. On July 4, it changed its graphic package with the launch of a new logo and look. In September, Disney's youth series and comedies returned to the channel after the name change from NexTV to América Next (today Global).

Television networks in Peru
Spanish-language television stations
Television channels and stations established in 2009